Battle of Villafranca may refer to:

 Battle of Villafranca (1744), during the War of the Austrian Succession
 Battle of Villafranca (1809), during the Peninsular War